89 Aquarii (abbreviated 89 Aqr) is a binary star system in the equatorial constellation of Aquarius. 89 Aquarii is the Flamsteed designation,  though it also bears the Bayer designation c3 Aquarii. The apparent visual magnitude of +4.69 is bright enough to be seen with the naked eye.

The primary component of this system has a magnitude of 5.27 and a stellar classification of G3 II, which suggests this is an evolved star in the bright giant stage. The companion is an A-type main sequence star with a stellar classification of A2 V. As of 2010, it is located at an angular separation of 0.1843 arcseconds along a position angle of 135.1°. They orbit each other with an estimated period of 201 years and a semimajor axis of 0.45 arcseconds.

References

External links
 Image 89 Aquarii

Aquarius (constellation)
Aquarii, c3
Aquarii, 089
218640
114375
G-type bright giants
A-type main-sequence stars
Bright Star Catalogue objects
CD-23 17771
Binary stars